Les McCann Sings is an album by pianist and vocalist Les McCann recorded in 1961 and released on the Pacific Jazz label.

Reception

The AllMusic review by Ron Wynn called the album: "A super set... Soul-jazz and blues at their best".

Track listing 
 "Wonder Why" (Nicholas Brodszky, Sammy Cahn) – 2:58	
 "It's Way Past Suppertime" (Les McCann, Vicki Arnold) – 3:06
 "'Deed I Do" (Fred Rose, Walter Hirsch) – 2:54
 "Since I Fell for You" (Buddy Johnson) – 3:37
 "But Not for Me" (George Gershwin, Ira Gershwin) – 2:58
 "I Cried for You" (Arthur Freed, Abe Lyman, Gus Arnheim) – 2:24
 "Sweet Georgia Brown" (Ben Bernie, Maceo Pinkard, Kenneth Casey) – 2:27
 "Please Send Me Someone to Love" (Percy Mayfield) – 2:32
 "Next Spring" (Marvin Jenkins) – 3:21
 "Love Letters" (Victor Young, Edward Heyman) – 3:16
 "On the Street Where You Live" (Frederick Loewe, Alan Jay Lerner) – 3:10
 "Bye Bye Blackbird" (Ray Henderson, Mort Dixon) – 2:07

Personnel 
Les McCann – vocals, piano
Herbie Lewis – bass
Ron Jefferson – drums
John Audino, Charlie Meeks, Ray Triscari, Jimmy Zito – trumpet (tracks 1, 4, 6 & 8)
Bob Edmondson (tracks 1, 4, 6 & 8), John Ewing (tracks 1, 4, 6 & 8), Lawrence "Tricky" Lofton (track 9) – trombone
Kenny Shroyer – bass trombone (tracks 1, 4, 6 & 8)
Buddy Collette (tracks 1, 2, 4–6, 8 & 10), Charles Lloyd (tracks 1, 4, 6 & 8) – alto saxophone, flute
Teddy Edwards (tracks 1, 4, 6 & 8), Harold Land (tracks 1, 4, 6 & 8), Ben Webster (track 9) – tenor saxophone 
Jack Nimitz – baritone saxophone (tracks 1, 4, 6 & 8)
Bobby Bruce, Carl Kalash, Dan Lube, Ed Lustgarten, George Poole, Jerome Reisler, Darrell Terwilliger – violin (tracks 2, 5 & 10)
Myron Sandler – viola (tracks 2, 5 & 10)
Charles Gates – cello (tracks 2, 5 & 10)
Dolo Coker – rhythm piano (tracks 2, 5 & 10) 
Richard "Groove" Holmes – organ (track 9) 
George Freeman – guitar (track 9) 
Gerald Wilson – arranger, conductor, director (tracks 1, 2, 4–6, 8 & 10)

References 

Les McCann albums
Albums arranged by Gerald Wilson
Albums conducted by Gerald Wilson
1961 albums
Pacific Jazz Records albums